Åke Viktor Ored Ström (28 February 1909 – 20 August 1994) was a Swedish theologian who specialized in the study of Germanic religion.

Biography
Åke V. Ström was born in Karlskrona, Sweden on 28 February 1909, the son of Tord Ström and Agnes Palm. He gained his fil kand from Stockholm University in 1930, and his teol kand from Uppsala University in 1935. Ström was ordained as a priest in 1936. He gained his teol dr from Uppsala University in 1945. Since 1965, Ström was a docent in religious history at Lund University. He was a highly regarded religious scholar, and a known authority on Old Norse religion. Ström died in Kista, Sweden on 20 August 1994.

Selected works
 Germanische und Baltische Religion, 1975 (with Haralds Biezais).

See also
 Anders Hultgård
 Dag Strömbäck

References

1909 births
1994 deaths
Germanic studies scholars
Academic staff of Lund University
Old Norse studies scholars
People from Karlskrona
Stockholm University alumni
Swedish theologians
Uppsala University alumni
Writers on Germanic paganism